Sri Sarada College for Women, is a women's general degree college located at Sarada Nagar, Ariyakulam, Tirunelveli district, Tamil Nadu. It was established in the year 1986. The college is affiliated with Manonmaniam Sundaranar University. This college offers different courses in arts, commerce and science.

Departments

Science
Physics
Chemistry
Mathematics
Computer Science and Application
Information Technology

Arts and Commerce
Tamil
English
Sanskrit
Economics
Physical Education
Library Science
Business Administration
Commerce
Social Work - MSW

Accreditation
The college is  recognized by the University Grants Commission (UGC).

References

External links

Educational institutions established in 1986
1986 establishments in Tamil Nadu
Colleges affiliated to Manonmaniam Sundaranar University
Universities and colleges in Tirunelveli district